7th OTO Awards

SND, Bratislava, Slovakia

Overall winner  Peter Marcin

Hall of Fame  Mária Kráľovičová

EuroTelevízia Award  Najväčšie kriminálne prípady Slovenska

◄ 6th | 8th ►

The 7th OTO Awards, honoring the best in Slovak popular culture for the year 2006, took time and place on March 14, 2007, at the former Opera building of the Slovak National Theater in Bratislava. The ceremony broadcast live STV. The host of the show was Jozef Bednárik.

Performers

 Peter Cmorik, singer
 Marián Čekovský, musician
 Desmod, band
 Karel Gott, singer
 Adriana Kučerová, opera singer
 Dara Rolins, singer
 Martina Schindlerová, singer
 Laci Strike and Street Dance Academy, dancers

Winners and nominees

Main categories
 Television

 Music

Others

Superlatives

Multiple winners
 2 awards
 Susedia – Markíza

Multiple nominees
 2 nominations
 Susedia – Markíza

Reception

TV ratings
The show has received a total audience of more than 855,000 viewers, making it the most watched television program within prime time in the region.

References

External links
 Archive > OTO 2006 – 7th edition  (Official website)
 OTO 2006 – 7th edition (Official website - old)
 Winners and nominees - Top 3 list (at Trend)

07
2006 in Slovak music
2006 in Slovak television
2006 television awards